Pseudoxyrhopus is a genus of harmless pseudoxyrhophiids found only on the island of Madagascar. Eleven species are currently recognized.

Species 
 Pseudoxyrhopus ambreensis Mocquard, 1895
 Pseudoxyrhopus analabe Nussbaum, Andreone & Raxworthy, 1998
 Pseudoxyrhopus ankafinaensis Raxworthy & Nussbaum, 1994
 Pseudoxyrhopus heterurus (Jan, 1893) — Night Brook Snake
 Pseudoxyrhopus imerinae (Günther, 1890) — Plateau Brook Snake 
 Pseudoxyrhopus kely Raxworthy & Nussbaum, 1994
 Pseudoxyrhopus microps Günther, 1881 — Brown Brook Snake
 Pseudoxyrhopus oblecator Cadle, 1999
 Pseudoxyrhopus quinquelineatus (Günther, 1881) — Striped Brook Snake
 Pseudoxyrhopus sokosoko Raxworthy & Nussbaum, 1994
 Pseudoxyrhopus tritaeniatus Mocquard, 1894

References

External links 
 

Pseudoxyrhophiidae
Snake genera
Reptiles of Madagascar
Endemic fauna of Madagascar
Taxa named by Albert Günther